The second-generation Ford Taurus is an automobile that was produced by Ford from 1991 to 1995, which served as the second out of six generations of the Ford Taurus. The second-generation Taurus shared all of its mechanical parts with the first-generation Ford Taurus, yet its exterior and interior were nearly completely redesigned. However, its exterior still strongly resembled that of the first-generation Taurus, leading many to believe that the second-generation was simply a facelift of the first-generation Taurus. However, this is partially true because the wagon model, from the B-pillar to the rear of the car, was a carryover from the first generation. The second generation of Taurus proved to be very popular, selling 410,000 units in its first year, becoming the best-selling car in the United States.
It would hold this title until 1995, when it was discontinued and replaced with the third-generation Ford Taurus.

Overview

Exterior 
The exterior of the second generation was completely redesigned from the first generation. Its length was increased by a few inches, and it was a couple of hundred pounds heavier, and had a more rounded roofline. Every body panel, save for the doors, was redesigned. However, many of the redesigned components closely resembled that of the previous generation, leading many to falsely believe that this generation is just a face-lift of the previous generation.

The front nose was redesigned with slimmer headlights, while retaining the first generation's "bottom breather" nose, albeit in a more aerodynamically efficient design that flowed into the front bumper. In the rear, it received new taillights that closely resembled those of the previous generation, as well as an entirely new rear clip. The trunk was also redesigned, with a spoiler being integrated into the trunk lid's design to make the car more aerodynamically efficient.

Also with this generation, each model of Taurus received different exterior trim. The lowest level Taurus L had light grey plastic mirrors and window trim, while the bumpers and side trim were also light grey. The GL, the mid priced model, got chrome window trim and body color mirrors, while still retaining the grey bumpers and side trim. The top-of-the-line LX model had its bumpers color keyed, as well as having the grey side trim replaced with color keyed body cladding. 1992 L and GL models (and the Mercury Sable GS) could also be ordered with a two-tone paint job, in which instead of being grey, the bumpers and side trim were painted a slightly darker shade of the vehicle's body color.  To cut costs, this was discontinued for the 1993 model year, as all models received color-matched trim and bumpers from that year onward.

Interior

The interior was also completely redesigned for 1992. The Taurus received a new dashboard that, like the previous generation, was designed to be user friendly. Like the previous generation, it had all of the vehicle's main controls located near the left side of the dash, to be within the easy reach of the driver. Also like the previous generation, all of the controls were designed to be recognizable by touch, and to be operated by the driver without taking their eyes off the road. The new dash also contained three buttons to the right of the gauge cluster that allowed the driver to operate the radio without taking their eyes off the road. The radio was also redesigned, while the rest of the lower dash was carried over from the previous generation, as was the steering wheel. The new dash was also designed to contain a passenger's side airbag, a first of its kind. It was optional in 1991 in 1992 models, and became standard in 1993, making the Taurus the first car of its kind to have dual front airbags.

The seats and door panels were also redesigned. The new door panels contained integrated armrests, with the controls for the power windows and locks mounted flat on its frontal part, allowing the driver to operate them without moving their arm. These switches, along with all of the main controls, would become illuminated when the headlights were turned on, allowing the driver to easily see them at night.

Unlike the first generation, the interior was not as customizable in the second generation, and many options that were previously available were cut for 1992. The second generation now used only a single seat design shared with all models (the first generation LX got its own unique seat design), and was only available in two configurations; with a front bench seat and a column mounted shifter, or with front bucket seats and a center console with a floor mounted shifter. The console was a carryover from the first generation, although it was redesigned for 1993. The station wagon variant included dual fold-down rear-facing seats in the back

Production Figures

Models and engines

For 1992, the Taurus was available in three models; L, GL, and LX. As with the first generation, the L was the basic model, the GL was the mid-priced value model, and the LX was the luxury model. Due to disappointing sales, the L was dropped after 1992, leaving the GL as the entry-level model. For the 1995 model year, a new SE model was added, intended to be a budget version of the SHO. It was a step above the entry-level GL, a step below the top of the line LX, and came standard with front bucket seats and a center console with a floor-mounted shifter, as well as a rear spoiler borrowed from the SHO. The SE was never available as a wagon.

The second generation also came in a modified police version. A police Taurus was a GL trim with the 3.8 liter Essex V6 engine that was slightly different from the regular Essex engine. Output of the police Essex version was  greater than the standard due to the addition of a dual exhaust muffler system, similar to that standard on the SHO; a Y-pipe was added after the resonator, which allowed for the split to both sides of the rear of the vehicle. Other changes included a larger fuel tank, stainless steel brake lines, standard four-wheel disc brakes with ABS, a modified front grille fascia that had a slit to allow for increased airflow to the radiator, and a certified calibration  speedometer. Some were bought for speed limit enforcement, with the anonymity of the car aiding in the role. The Taurus police package didn't prove to be very popular, and it was often strongly outsold by Ford's own Crown Victoria.

When the 2.5 L HSC four-cylinder was dropped in early 1991, along with the three-speed ATX automatic transmission, all following second-generation Taurus models came standard with the 140 horsepower (104 kW) 3.0 L Vulcan V6, except for the LX wagon that came with a 3.8 L Essex V6. The Essex was optional on all other Taurus models. Every engine in this generation used the four-speed AXOD-E automatic transmission, until 1993, when it was replaced by the four-speed AX4S transmission, which was used for the rest of this generation's production run in most models. Some 1994–1995 3.0 L came with the AX4N transaxle.

This generation Taurus was exported to Japan in limited numbers, and sold at Japanese auto dealerships called Autorama (a joint venture with Mazda), where the Taurus SHO was the only model available in both sedan and wagon versions with left-hand driving positions until 1995. To Japanese buyers, it was regarded as a luxury vehicle as the exterior dimensions and engine displacement exceeded Japanese government regulations, and buyers in Japan were liable for additional taxes.

Variants

Mercury Sable

A redesigned Mercury Sable, a sister model to the Taurus aimed at a more upscale audience, went on sale alongside the Taurus in 1991. Like the first generation, the Sable shared all of the Taurus' mechanical components but had a unique body and interior. Similar to the Taurus, the second-generation Sable's design closely resembled the first-generation model, though the body and interior were almost completely redesigned and the new model was shorter than its predecessor; while the first generation Sable had an extended wheelbase, the redesigned model had the same wheelbase as the Taurus. The new model was still offered in GS and LS models in sedan and wagon bodies, a top-of-the-line LTS trim was offered on the sedan during the 1995 model year. Powertrains and most options were the same as the Taurus, though no counterpart of the Taurus SHO was offered. The Sable was produced concurrently alongside the Taurus through the 1995 model year.

In 1993, Ford Canada hand-built 40 Mercury Sables powered by SHO V6 engines as part of their AIV (Aluminum Intensive Vehicle) program and released 20 to the public. Using aluminum suspension elements and aluminum body panels, held together with a spot welding process and adhesive joining process developed specifically for this vehicle, the end result was a car that was 400 pounds lighter than a SHO Taurus. In 1995, Multimatic Motorsports entered one of these vehicles in the One Lap of America event, finishing 15th overall and 1st in the Mid-Priced Sedan class.

Ford Taurus SHO

The second-generation Ford Taurus SHO was launched in the fall of 1991, along with the Taurus. Unlike the first generation, this SHO contained less aggressive body cladding, as well as a unique front end using parts largely borrowed from the Mercury Sable. Like the Taurus and Sable, the SHO's drivetrain was carried over from the first generation. The only major change came on 1993s, when an automatic transmission became optional. Automatic equipped cars got a slightly bigger engine with equal horsepower due to less aggressive camshafts.

References and notes

External links

Taurus Car Club of America
Second Generation Taurus encyclopedia

2nd generation
Mid-size cars
Sedans
Station wagons
Front-wheel-drive vehicles
Cars introduced in 1991